Ernst Dieter Rossmann (born 4 February 1951) is a German politician of the Social Democratic Party (SPD) who served as a member of the Bundestag from the state of Schleswig-Holstein from 1998 until 2021.

Political career 
From 1987 until 1998, Rossmann served as a member of the State Parliament of Schleswig-Holstein. In this capacity, he was his parliamentary group’s spokesperson for education policy from 1988 until 1996.

Rossmann became a member of the Bundestag in the 1998 German federal election, representing the Pinneberg district. Throughout his time in parliament, he was a member of the Committee on Education, Research and Technology Assessment.

In the negotiations to form a Grand Coalition of Chancellor Angela Merkel's Christian Democrats (CDU together with the Bavarian CSU) and the SPD following the 2013 federal elections, Rossmann was part of the SPD delegation in the working group on education and research policy, led by Johanna Wanka and Doris Ahnen.

In July 2020, Rossmann announced that he would not stand in the 2021 federal elections but instead resign from active politics by the end of the parliamentary term.

Other activities 
 University of Flensburg, Member of the Advisory Board
 Education and Science Workers' Union (GEW), Member
 Nature and Biodiversity Conservation Union (NABU), Member

References

External links 

  
 Bundestag biography 

1951 births
Living people
Members of the Bundestag for Schleswig-Holstein
Members of the Bundestag 2017–2021
Members of the Bundestag 2013–2017
Members of the Bundestag 2009–2013
Members of the Bundestag 2005–2009
Members of the Bundestag 2002–2005
Members of the Bundestag 1998–2002
Members of the Bundestag for the Social Democratic Party of Germany
Recipients of the Cross of the Order of Merit of the Federal Republic of Germany